R.F.C. Tournai is a Belgian association football club from the city of Tournai, Hainaut.  It is the result of the merger between R. Union Sportive Tournaisienne (matricule n°26) and R.R.C. Tournaisien (n°36) in 2002.  The club wears the matricule n°26 and plays in the Third Amateur Division.

History

R. Union Sportive Tournaisienne history
Union Sportive Tournaisienne was founded in 1902 and became a member of the Belgian Football Association one year later.  It played in the second division as soon as the competition was officially started in 1910.  The club reached its peak when it played its only one season in the first division in 1951–52.  It finished last (16th) with 3 wins and 12 points.  In 2002 Tournai won the Promotion A and it merged with the Racing so that the new R.F.C. began in the third division.

R.F.C. Tournai history
Tournai began with a nice 6th place in 2003 but could not avoid relegation the next year when it finished 15th (on 16).  In 2005 it won the Promotion A. On November, 24th, 2007 Thierry Pister was appointed as the new head coach for the club.

Current squad

As of 18 October 2013.

Staff

Head Coach
  Mickael Browaeys

Assistant Coach
  Fabien Delbeeke

Goalkeeper Coach
  Christophe Martin

Team Chef
  Abdel Araci

References

External links
 Official site
 Belgian football clubs history
 RSSSF Archive 1st and 2nd division final tables

Football clubs in Belgium
Association football clubs established in 1902
1902 establishments in Belgium
Organisations based in Belgium with royal patronage
R.F.C. Tournai
Belgian Pro League clubs